Equity One, Inc. was a real estate investment trust that invested in shopping centers in New York, Boston, Washington D.C., San Francisco, Los Angeles, Atlanta and Florida. As of December 31, 2016, it owned 122 properties comprising 12.8 million square feet.

In March 2017, the company was acquired by Regency Centers.

History
The company was founded in 1992 and became a public company via an initial public offering in 1998.

In March 2017, the company was acquired by Regency Centers.

External links

References

Companies formerly listed on the New York Stock Exchange
1998 initial public offerings
2017 mergers and acquisitions